William J. Day (November 18, 1876 – May 30, 1950) was a judge from South Boston, Massachusetts and the ninth state deputy of the Massachusetts Knights of Columbus.  William J. Day Boulevard is named for him.

Day was born on November 18, 1876, in South Boston and died on May 30, 1950, in Dorchester, Massachusetts.  He received a bachelor's degree from Boston College and a law degree from Boston University.

With his wife, Anna F. McCarron, he was the father of Louise Day Hicks.  He had a son, John T. Day, and three other children.  He was appointed a judge by Governor David I. Walsh.  He is buried at Old Calvary Cemetery in West Roxbury, Massachusetts.

References

Works cited

1876 births
1950 deaths
Boston College people
Boston University School of Law alumni
Massachusetts state court judges